Monopoli is a town and municipality in Italy, in the Metropolitan City of Bari and region of Apulia. It has a population of 49,246 (2014) and is important mostly as an agricultural, industrial and tourist centre.

History

The area was first settled in about 500 BC as a fortified Messapian city. 
 
In order to improve communication with the East, between the years 108 and 110 AD, the Emperor Trajan ordered the construction of a Via Publica which was named after him. Monopoli is the city in Apulia that has the longest stretch of the Via Traiana. This is one of the most important Roman roads of the Empire. In 2012 the city of Monopoli created an archeological park around the remains of this ancient road. The difference between this new road and the Appian Way was the shorter distance between Benevento and Brindisi. The Appian Way started in Rome, reaching Benevento and continuing on to Taranto, and from there the road continued to Brindisi, from which port people could take ship for Greece, the Orient and the Balkans. The Via Traiana, which followed an older route, began in Benevento and crossing the flat tableland up to Canosa continued on to Ruvo, where a fork in the road led in two different directions. The inland road went to Modugno, Ceglie del Campo, Capurso, Rutigliano and Conversano, while the coastal road went to Bari, Polignano, and Monopoli. These two roads joined again at Egnazia, from where the road continued to Brindisi. This road which Emperor Trajan had constructed became the route of choice to reach Brindisi because it was shorter than the Appian Way. It was travelled by military troops, merchants, slaves, pilgrims and, after the fall of Rome, even by hordes of barbarians. There is another important road on the other side of the Adriatic Sea which seems to be the continuation of this road. It is called the Via Egnatia (Egnazia Way) and starts in Dyrrachium (Durazzo), in Albania, crossing a mountainous area to reach Thessaloniki (Salonica) and continuing on to Constantinople (Istanbul).

After the destruction of Gnatia by the Ostrogoth king Totila in 545, its inhabitants fled to Monopoli, from whence it derives its name as "only city". In the following centuries the area would be controlled by the Byzantines, Normans and Hohenstaufen. At the height of its splendour, the city was a point of departure for naval expeditions during the Crusades. Later it was a fief under Angevine and Aragonese feudal lords.

In 1484 the city came under Venetian control and saw an economic upswing as a seaport on the Adriatic Sea, a base between Bari and Brindisi as well as through trading its own agricultural goods. It was frequently attacked by Muslim pirates in the following decades. These continuous threats forced Monopoli to build strong fortifications which allowed them in 1529 to resist the Armada of Charles V for three months, forcing the Spaniards to abandon the siege. However, the following year saw Monopoli pass under Spanish rule while still remaining a free city.

It became part of the newly unified state Kingdom of Italy in 1860.

The city, lying in the south of Italy or Mezzogiorno, enjoyed a certain economic development during the 1960s grace to the opening of a Tognana (an important Italian ceramic manufacturer) industrial plant. The closure of the plant at the end of the 1990s was a major blow to the city's economy. Monopoli's economic recovery in the last year has been due mainly to new industries, the most important being MerMec, a manufacturer of railway material, along with the development of tourism, especially in the countryside and on the coast.

Geography

Overview
Located in the south-eastern corner of its province, near the borders with the one of Brindisi, and by the Adriatic Coast, Monopoli borders with the municipalities of Alberobello, Castellana Grotte, Fasano (BR) and Polignano a Mare. The town is 15 km from Fasano, 33 from Martina Franca, 44 from Bari, 64 from Taranto and 75 from Brindisi.

Frazioni
The territory outside the walled city counts 99 hamlets (frazioni) and localities named contrade. Some of them, which merged with the urbanized area of the town, were suppressed and became outer wards. The others are mostly rural localities, mainly composed by some scattered farmhouses.

The 99 contrade are: Aione, Antonelli, Aratico, Arenazza, Assunta, Balice, Barcato, Bellocchio, Belvedere, Cacaveccia, Capitolo, Cardillo, Caramanna, Carluccio, Carrassa, Casale, Cavallerizza, Cervarulo, Chianchizza, Chiesa dei Morti, Ciminiera, Ciporelli, Conchia, Corvino, Cozzana, Cristo Cozzana, Cristo delle Zolle, Cristo Re, Due Torri, Gorgofreddo, Gravina, Grotta dell'Acqua, Guadiano, Guidano, Impalata, Laghezza, Lama di Macina, Lamalunga, Lamammolilla, Lamantia, Lamarossa, Lamascrasciola, Losciale, Macchia di Casa, Macchia di Monte, Mazzone, Monte Scopa, Moredifame, Mozzo, Nispole, Padresergio, Pagliericci, Pantano (inurbata), Parco di Tuccio, Paretano, Passarello, Passionisti (inurbata), Peroscia, Petrarolo, Piangevino, Pilone, Romanelli, Samato, Sant' Andrea, Sant' Antonio d'Ascula, San Bartolomeo, San Francesco da Paola, San Gerardo, San Luca, San Lucia, San Nicola, Sant' Oceano, Sant' Oronzo, Santo Stefano, Santa Teresa, San Vincenzo, Scarciglia, Sicarico, Sorba, Spina, Stomazzelli, Tavanello, Terranova, Tormento, Torichiano, Torre d'Orta, Torricella, Tortorella, Vagone, Virbo, Zampogna, Zecca and Zingarello.

Demographics

Main sights

Castle of Charles V. Finished in 1525, it has a pentagonal plan. It is located on a promontory which was originally separated from the medieval city. It was restored and enlarged in the 17th century. Starting from the early 19th century, it was used as a jail, a status it kept until 1969. It is currently the seat of an art exhibition and cultural events.
Coastal castle of St. Stephen, built by the Norman lord Godfrey of Conversano in 1086. It was subsequently turned into a Benedictine monastery. 
Jerusalem Hospital, founded in 1350 by the Hospitallers
Monopoli Cathedral (18th century), minor basilica
Palazzo Palmieri (18th century)
Monte San Nicola (Mount St. Nicholas) faunal reserve.

Sport
The local football club is the S.S. Monopoli 1966. Its home ground is the Stadio Vito Simone Veneziani.

Notable people
 Giorgio Lapazaya (c. 1495 – c. 1570), mathematician and musician
 Giacomo Insanguine (1728–95), composer
 Domenico Morgante (1956), musicologist, organist and harpsichordist

Sportsmen and sportswomen
 Giandomenico Mesto (1982), footballer; bronze medal Olympic games 2004, gold medal European Under-21 2004
 Gianpiero Sportelli (1987), martial artist; k-1 world champion 2010 and European champion k-1 2013. Chessboxing world championship, bronze medal 2017 and silver medal 2019
 Vito Sardella (1974), distance runner 
 Marialucia Palmitessa (1998) clay pigeon shooting, world champion Juniores Trap.

International relations

Twin towns — sister cities
Monopoli is twinned with:
 Lyss, Switzerland
 Lugoj, Romania
 Vlorë, Albania

See also
Monopoli railway station

References

Bibliography
 Francesco Antonio Glianes, Monopoli nel Medioevo e nel Rinascimento, Schena Editore.
 L. Finamore Pepe, Monopoli e la Monarchia delle Puglie, Monopoli, 1897.
 Sebastiano Lillo, Monopoli sintesi storico geografica, Grafiche Colucci Monopoli, 1976.
 Stefano Carbonara, Monopoli nel Secondo Novecento, Schena Editore.
 Domenico Cofano, Monopoli nell'età del Rinascimento, Biblioteca Comunale Prospero Rendella.
 Giuseppe Andreassi, Mare d'Egnazia, Schena Editore.
 Domenico Capitanio, Il sistema difensivo e la città, Monopoli nel suo passato vol.5, Comune di Monopoli, Grafischena s.r.l., Fasano. 1992.

External links

 Monopoli official website
 Office of tourism of Monopoli
 Meteo and city webcam of Monopoli

 
Cities and towns in Apulia
Coastal towns in Apulia
Castles in Italy
Populated places established in the 1st millennium BC
Territories of the Republic of Venice